Cevaeria estebani is a species of beetle in the family Cerambycidae, the only species in the genus Cevaeria.

References

Cerambycini